Glenn Fant McConnell (born December 11, 1947) is an American politician from South Carolina. He was a member of the South Carolina Senate, representing the 41st District from 1981 to March 13, 2012. He ascended to the office of lieutenant governor on March 13, 2012 because he was the Senate President Pro Tempore. He served as the 89th Lieutenant Governor of South Carolina until June 18, 2014. The office of lieutenant governor had become vacant because of the resignation of Ken Ard on March 9, 2012 due to his indictment by a state Grand Jury for ethics violations.

On March 22, 2014, he was chosen as the 22nd president of the College of Charleston, a selection which was criticized by some of the students, faculty, and community due to his support for the Confederate flag and a widely circulated photo of him dressed as a Confederate general. He served as the president of the College of Charleston from 2014 to 2018.

Early life, education, and early career
McConnell was born in 1947 in Charleston, South Carolina, to the late Samuel W. McConnell and the late Evelyn McDaniel McConnell. He is a lifelong resident of the city and graduated from St Paul's High School in 1965. He attended the College of Charleston. While there, he was active in the Alpha Chapter of the Pi Kappa Phi fraternity, served in student government, and was elected president of the student body. He graduated with a B.S. in 1969 and a J.D. from University of South Carolina School of Law in 1972.

He first served as a staff attorney with the Charleston City Legal Assistance Program. He became a Labor Management Relations Specialist with the Charleston Naval Shipyard and afterwards went into private practice. He retired from law to manage his family business, CSA Galleries. This business operated for over 20 years and was known to specialize in Civil War memorabilia. He is also a Co-Owner of The Wild House LTD.

Early political career
McConnell served as chairman for county Republican Party from 1978 to 1982. He was a delegate at the Republican National Convention in 1980, 1984, and 1988.

South Carolina Senate (1981-2012)

Elections
He was first elected to South Carolina's 41st Senate District in 1980, and was re-elected every four years until his last re-election in 2008. He was rarely challenged by a Democrat.

Tenure
McConnell was the Senate President Pro Tempore from 2001 to 2012. He held a lot of power in that position. During Mark Sanford's administration, McConnell, alongside Hugh Leatherman and Bobby HarrellI effectively controlled state policy. In 2007, he sponsored the Base Load Review Act which ultimately resulted in the Nukegate scandal a decade later. McConnell was one of several South Carolina politicians credited with playing a key role in getting Boeing Co. to announce plans to build a 787 Dreamliner assembly plant in North Charleston, S.C. in October 2009. The incentives package offered to Boeing was valued at $470 million.

Confederate flag

McConnell is a member of the Sons of Confederate Veterans, Secession Camp #4.  The Sons of Confederate Veterans were charged in 1906 by Lt. General Stephen Dill Lee, Commander General of the United Confederate Veterans, with "the vindication of the cause for which we fought."

During a 1999 appearance on ABC News' Nightline, then-Senator McConnell made the following statements about the flag:
 I see honor, courage, valor. I see the red, white and blue and the blood of sacrifice that ran through that battle and the people that carried that flag. I don't see black and white. I don't see racism.
 It hurts us to see groups like the Klan holding that flag. You want to talk about a sick feeling? Our group, our historical groups, we are disgusted when we see it. But we're equally disgusted and sickened by the political rhetoric and people say it's an emblem of racism, it's an emblem of hate, it's shameful and all of this. How do they think we feel when it's the emblem of our ancestors? They hurt our feelings.
 We will teach generations to come about the honor of these people and if they are going to choose the road of trying to stereotype us as racists and as hate mongers, then we are forever divided.

In 2000, when the Confederate flag was brought down from atop the dome of the State House, Senator McConnell successfully advocated for flying another Confederate flag from a flagpole in the front of the Statehouse, on the grounds, near the Confederate Soldier Monument.  He rejected the suggestion that the Confederate flag be placed in a glass case by saying, "Encasement represents entombment," and by saying that he wanted "no part in symbolically burying the Confederate banner."  The resulting bill that was passed in 2000 was called a compromise.

After the 2015 shooting at a historically black church, McConnell condemned the shooter's motives, in which he said that he does not represent the Confederate flag or the South. He also supported the decision of Governor Nikki Haley to remove the Confederate flag from the South Carolina State House.

Committee assignments
Senate Rules Committee (previous chairman)
Senate Judiciary Committee (chairman)
Senate Banking and Insurance Committee
Senate Ethics Committee
Senate Interstate Cooperation Committee
Senate Labor, Commerce, and Industry Committee

Lieutenant governor (2012–14)
Incumbent Republican Lieutenant Governor Ken Ard resigned his position in March 2012 because of ethics violations. At that time, the State Senate President Pro Tempore, became the lieutenant governor when the position became vacant, leading to McConnell resigning his senate seat to become the lieutenant governor.

Presidency of the College of Charleston 
On June 18, 2014, McConnell resigned his position as lieutenant governor to become president of the College of Charleston on July 1, 2014. McConnell assumed the presidency of his alma mater in July 2014. He is a former student body president at the College of Charleston, where he earned his undergraduate B.S. degree in political science in 1969. He has an Honorary Doctorate of Humane Letters from the College of Charleston as well as other honorary degrees.

In 2016, following reports of sexual assault, McConnell temporarily banned alcohol from Greek activities. He also oversaw the implementation of the Collegiate Recovery Program, an initiative that supported students in recovery from addiction. In the Summer of 2016, the College of Charleston stopped considering race a factor in student enrollment.

On January 29, 2018, McConnell announced his retirement from the College of Charleston citing health issues.

References

External links
 South Carolina Lieutenant Governor's website 
 South Carolina's Office on Aging website
Project Vote Smart - Senator Glenn F. McConnell (SC) profile
Follow the Money - Glenn McConnell
2006 2004 2002 2000 1996 campaign contributions

|-

1947 births
American Episcopalians
College of Charleston alumni
Lieutenant Governors of South Carolina
Living people
Presidents of the College of Charleston
South Carolina lawyers
Republican Party South Carolina state senators
Politicians from Charleston, South Carolina
University of South Carolina School of Law alumni
Lawyers from Charleston, South Carolina
Members of Sons of Confederate Veterans